WEVU may refer to:

 WeVu.Video, web application video software for education
 WEVU-CA, a defunct low-powered television station (channel 4) in Fort Myers, Florida, United States
 WZVN-TV, a television station (channel 26) licensed to serve Naples, Florida, which held the call sign WEVU from 1974 to 1995